Lloyd Appleton Metzler (1913 – 26 October 1980) was an American economist best known for his contributions to international trade theory.  He was born in Lost Springs, Kansas in 1913.  Although most of his career was spent at the University of Chicago, he was not a member of the Chicago school, but rather a Keynesian. 

Lloyd was the youngest of three sons of Leroy and Lulu Appleton Metzler, who were both schoolteachers and both had college degrees. All three of the boys attended the University of Kansas at Lawrence. Leroy was a civil engineer, and Donald became the head of the engineering department and served as mayor of Lawrence. Lloyd was heading for a degree and career in business until he fell under the tutelage of John Ise, who convinced him to switch to economics, and who was a lifelong hero.

After graduation, Metzler received his PhD in Economics at Harvard University, where he became great friends with Paul Samuelson.

Metzler worked post-World War II with the Office of Strategic Services (OSS) in Washington DC, and spent much of that time working on post-war reconstruction in Europe.

Metzler was awarded a Guggenheim Fellowship in 1942 upon completing his PhD at Harvard.  He was made a Distinguished Fellow of the American Economic Association in 1968.

In the early 1950s Metzler's career was severely impacted by the discovery of a brain tumor, and several surgeries. He continued to teach for another 20 years at the University of Chicago.

The Metzler paradox as well as Metzler matrices bear his name.

Notable students
 Arnold C. Harberger - Chief Economic Advisor, USAID; former president of the American Economic Association

Influences
 Alice Bourneuf
 Evsey Domar
 Paul Samuelson

References

 
 George Horwich and John Pomery, 2008. "Metzler, Lloyd Appleton (1913–1980)," The New Palgrave Dictionary of Economics Online, 2nd Ed. Macmillan. Cross references. Accessed 7 May 2009.
 Lloyd A. Metzler, 1973. Collected Papers, Harvard University Press.  Description and chapter-previews via scroll down.

External Sources

Guide to the Lloyd A. Metzler Papers 1941-1948 at the University of Chicago Special Collections Research Center

1913 births
1980 deaths
People from Marion County, Kansas
University of Chicago faculty
University of Kansas alumni
Harvard University alumni
Keynesians
Fellows of the Econometric Society
20th-century American economists
Distinguished Fellows of the American Economic Association
Economists from Kansas